Fred Ellis (22 July 1907 – 31 December 1963) was a South African boxer. He competed in the men's welterweight event at the 1928 Summer Olympics. He lost in first fight of the tournament to Johan Hellström of Finland.

References

External links
 

1907 births
1963 deaths
South African male boxers
Olympic boxers of South Africa
Boxers at the 1928 Summer Olympics
Place of birth missing
Welterweight boxers